Jean-Paul Yaovi Dosseh Abalo (born 26 June 1975 in Lomé, Togo) is a former Togolese football defender and current coach of the Togo national under-20 football team.

Club career
Abalo played for six seasons in the French Ligue 2 with Amiens SC. In 2006, he moved to APOEL in Cyprus, where he won the 2005–06 Cypriot Cup. Whilst at Amiens, Abalo played in the 2001 Coupe de France Final. It was his penalty miss that proved decisive as Amiens lost to Strasbourg.

International career
He was the captain of the Togo national football team, was called up to the 2006 World Cup, and represented his country at four Africa Cup of Nations tournaments. His contribution to the team's World Cup campaign was overshadowed by the red card he received in the opening match against South Korea, as his side suffered a 1–2 defeat.

Coaching career

In January 2018, Abalo was announced as the Togo national under-20 football team coach for the 2018 Toulon Tournament.

Honours
APOEL
Cypriot Cup: 2005–06

References

 

1975 births
Living people
Sportspeople from Lomé
Togolese footballers
Togolese expatriate footballers
Togo international footballers
Ethnikos Piraeus F.C. players
APOEL FC players
LB Châteauroux players
Amiens SC players
OC Agaza players
USL Dunkerque players
Al-Merrikh SC players
Ligue 2 players
Cypriot First Division players
2006 FIFA World Cup players
1998 African Cup of Nations players
2000 African Cup of Nations players
2002 African Cup of Nations players
2006 Africa Cup of Nations players
Expatriate footballers in Greece
Expatriate footballers in Cyprus
Association football defenders
21st-century Togolese people